Chiaracce (possibly from Aymara ch'iyara black, jaqhi precipice, cliff, "black cliff") is a mountain in the Vilcanota mountain range in the Andes of Peru, about  high. It is situated in the Puno Region, Melgar Province, Nuñoa District. Chiaracce lies southeast of the mountain Chiaraje on the border of the Cusco Region and the Puno Region and east of the mountain Lliptani.

References

Mountains of Peru
Mountains of Puno Region